Musica Records was a jazz record label.

Discography

Jazz record labels